Karen Jonz Domingos Santos Claudio, known as Karen Jonz (born 29 September 1983), is a Brazilian skateboarder, designer and singer. She won the World Cup Skateboarding four times in the women's vertical class and also won the 2008 X Games women's vert skateboarding competition in Los Angeles.

Biography 
Karen was born in Santos in 1985. She moved to Santo André at age 5 and began skating at age 17, an age considered late for skateboarders. In her beginning, she competed in the men's tournaments.

Achievements 

X Games

Women's vert
2006-3rd place
2008-1st place
2009-2nd place
2010-3rd placeWorld Cup SkateboardingWomen's vert- won 2006, 2008, 2013 and 2014.'''

Personal life 
She has a label named "Monstra Maçã"

Jonz married Lucas Silveira, vocalist for the band Fresno. They have a daughter.

References

1985 births
Brazilian skateboarders
Female skateboarders
Living people
Sportspeople from Santos, São Paulo